Jinxi may refer to the following locations in China:

Huludao, Liaoning
Jinxi County (金溪县), Fuzhou, Jiangxi
 Jinxi, Hengyang (金溪镇), a town of Hengyang County, Hunan.
Jinxi, Kunshan (锦溪镇), a town in Kunshan, a city in Jiangsu Province
Jinxi, Longquan (锦溪镇), a town in Longquan, a city in Zhejiang Province

See also
Jin Xi (Han), a Han general during the Chu-Han Contention
Jingxi (disambiguation)